Böbel or Bobel is a German-language surname. Notable people with this surname include:

 Betsy Bobel, American beauty pageant winner
 Ingo Böbel (1947–2020), German political scientist and economist
 Tomasz Bobel (1974), retired Polish footballer

See also
 Bobel Cay, island in Honduras

References

German-language surnames
Surnames from nicknames